Poole by-election may refer to

 1874 Poole by-election
 1884 Poole by-election

Disambiguation pages